The discography of At the Gates, a Swedish melodic death metal band from Gothenburg formed in 1990, consists of seven studio albums, three extended plays, one live album, four split albums, one video album and thirteen music videos.

Albums

Studio albums

Compilation albums

Live albums

Split albums

Video albums

Extended plays

Music videos

References

External links

Heavy metal group discographies
Discographies of Swedish artists